The Episcopal Church of the Transfiguration, an Episcopal church building in Belle Plaine, Minnesota is a Carpenter Gothic style building with wooden buttresses. Sometimes referred to as a "prairie Gothic" church, it was built in 1868 for English-speaking parishioners, but most of the rural residents at the time were German and Irish immigrants who brought their own languages and religious practices with them. The result was a church building that struggled to attract worshipers for 80 years before it was abandoned. It is listed on the National Register of Historic Places.

References

Churches on the National Register of Historic Places in Minnesota
Churches completed in 1869
19th-century Episcopal church buildings
Episcopal church buildings in Minnesota
Carpenter Gothic church buildings in Minnesota
Buildings and structures in Scott County, Minnesota
1869 establishments in Minnesota
National Register of Historic Places in Scott County, Minnesota